Kevin Stitt is an American film editor with more than 35 credits to his name. Stitt was nominated for the Saturn Award for Best Editing in 2016 for his work on Jurassic World. He was also nominated for the American Cinema Editors Award for Best Edited Documentary in 2009 for Michael Jackson's This Is It along with three other editors.

Filmography

Editing

References

External links

American film editors
American Cinema Editors
Living people
Year of birth missing (living people)